Garbage collection, or waste collection, is part of municipal waste management.

Garbage collection may also refer to:

 Garbage collection (computer science), in automatic memory management
 Garbage collection (SSD), in flash memory